The 1988 Big League World Series took place from August 13–20 in Fort Lauderdale, Florida, United States. In a championship rematch, Taipei, Taiwan defeated host Broward County, Florida twice in the championship game. It was Taiwan's second straight championship.

Teams

Results

References

Big League World Series
Big League World Series